Nordkapp (North Cape) is the northernmost point of Nordaustlandet, Svalbard in Arctic Norway, located at the northern extreme of Chermsideøya, off the coast of Nordaustlandet.

References 

Headlands of Norway
Headlands of Nordaustlandet